Dinoterb is a chemical compound used as an herbicide. It is an uncoupler.

References

Herbicides
Dinitrophenols
Tert-butyl compounds
Uncoupling agents